Janko Katić (fl. 1795–1806†) was a Serbian voivode and one of the organizers of the First Serbian Uprising (1804–1813).  He participated in the uprising since day one, and was an important oborknez of the Šabac district, and was one of the most courageous commanders, so influential as a military and political leader that he was held by many as the second only to Karađorđe Petrović, the leader, in Šumadija.

Life
Janko was born in Rogača, beneath the Kosmaj. In his youth, he mostly lived in Belgrade with his sister, who was married to a Turk. In this time he learned Turkish, which would benefit him later on. He, however, came to bad terms with his sister's husband and was forced to leave and return to Rogača. In the region, the Uprising was planned and he joined the uprising and was appointed as the knez of one of the former Ottoman nahiyah, and as he was known for being just, prudent and heroic, he quickly became the head commander of the Belgrade nahija. He had a good appearance, and in the assemblies, he was a good speaker, and in the battles, he was a very adaptive, adroit, and heroic chief. He was popular with the people, and his contemporaries called him "prude and heroic Janko". He was one of the most important figures of the First Serbian Uprising.

He participated in all battles since the beginning: Belgrade, Požarevac, Rudnik, Vrbica, etc. He, Vasa Čarapić and Sima Marković commanded 4,000 soldiers that besieged Belgrade. Karđorđe sent him to the fighting in Mačva, in 1806, as help. He showed great skills, and after the burning of the Sovljak village, he killed 65 Turks and took what they had confiscated earlier. He died while fighting the Ottomans around Šabac, in the village of Krnić, just before the Battle of Mišar.

His death was a huge loss for the Serbian revolutionaries.  Although he was a close friend of Karađorđe, he was part of the political group that sought to tackle the Vožd's autocracy.  Several more revolutionaries came from his family. His brother Jakob Katić was also a freedom fighter, a revolutionary.

See also
 List of Serbian Revolutionaries

References

Sources

 
 
 
Vojvoda Janko Katić
Michael Boro Petrovich, A history of modern Serbia, 1804-1918: Volume 1; Volume 1, Harcourt Brace Jovanovich, 1976
Војислав Суботић, Memorijali oslobodilačkih ratova Srbije, Book 1, Volume 1, Vlada Republike Srbije, Ministarstvo rada, zapošljavanja i socijalne politike, 2006

18th-century Serbian nobility
19th-century Serbian nobility
Serbian revolutionaries
People of the First Serbian Uprising
Šumadija
18th-century births
1806 deaths